The European Platform for Patients’ Organisations, Science & Industry, based in Brussels was established in 1994 as part of the initiative to promote patients' rights.  It is an independent, not-for-profit, partnership-based and multi-stakeholder think tank.   It is now also known as Digital Health Europe and is part of the  European Patients Forum. 

It is particularly concerned with Biobanking, geno-type research.  It involves a number of European-facing umbrella patients’ organisations including patients' organisations, commercial enterprises and their related trade bodies, research institutes, professional and business federations.
	 
John Peter Mary Wubbe, a Swiss transplant patient, is the Secretary General.

References 

Health activism
Organisations based in Brussels
Medical and health organisations based in Belgium